The Tourist Hotel on Main St. in Thompson Falls in Sanders County, Montana was built in 1912. It was listed on the National Register of Historic Places in 1986. It has also been known as Hotel Bar.

It was first owned by William Cummings, who arrived in Thompson Falls in 1906. In 1986, it was one of only five commercial buildings surviving from Thompson Falls' early community.  Its parapet with arcaded corbelling was assessed as "one of the strongest architectural decorative elements in the community."

References

External links

National Register of Historic Places in Sanders County, Montana
Hotel buildings completed in 1912
1912 establishments in Montana
Hotel buildings on the National Register of Historic Places in Montana
Thompson Falls, Montana